Lepteucosma is a genus of moths belonging to the subfamily Olethreutinae of the family Tortricidae.

Species
Lepteucosma aethopa (Diakonoff, 1984)
Lepteucosma alferdi Pooni & Rose, 2004
Lepteucosma blanda (Kawabe, 1989)
Lepteucosma byuni Pooni & Rose, 2004
Lepteucosma ceriodes (Meyrick, 1909)
Lepteucosma charassuncus Razowski, 2006
Lepteucosma ferruginoptera Pooni & Rose, 2004
Lepteucosma fuscicaput (Diakonoff, 1948)
Lepteucosma huebneriana (Kocak, 1980)
Lepteucosma leucotoma (Diakonoff, 1964)
Lepteucosma lutescens (Razowski, 1967)
Lepteucosma oxychrysa Diakonoff, 1971
Lepteucosma oxychrysoides Kuznetzov, 1997
Lepteucosma punjabica Kuznetzov, 1988
Lepteucosma shikokuensis (Kawabe, 1984)
Lepteucosma siamensis (Kawabe, 1989)
Lepteucosma srinagara Razowski, 2006
Lepteucosma torreyae Wu & Chen, 2006

See also
List of Tortricidae genera

References

External links
tortricidae.com

Eucosmini
Tortricidae genera
Taxa named by Alexey Diakonoff